Ptilinus ramicornis is a species of death-watch or spider beetle in the family Ptinidae. It is found in North America.

References

Further reading

 
 
 

Bostrichoidea
Beetles described in 1898